Chris Egan was one of the top men’s tennis players in the Northwest Conference all four of his years at Pacific Lutheran University, and the 1995 PLU Man of the Year in sports. He is also the 2012 Alumnus of the Year in Sports. Coming to PLU out of Puyallup High School, Chris helped lead the Lutes to four consecutive Northwest Conference titles from 1992-95. During those three years, he played No. 1 or No. 2 singles, and represented the school at the 1994 and 1995 NAIA national tournaments.

After starting his career in the mid 1990s in several small Pacific Northwest media markets, Egan came back to the Seattle area to work for Northwest Cable News as a sports anchor and producer on NorthWest Sports Tonight. He joined the KING 5 sports department as a reporter and anchor in June 2007.

Over the past decade, Chris Egan has won nine Emmy awards. In 2009 he won the Emmy for Sports Anchoring; in 2010, he received the Edward R. Murrow Award for Sports Story of the Year. In 2016 the Washington State football coaches association presented Chris Egan with the Silver Helmet Award for his coverage of high school sports. As a sports reporter at KING-TV Chris Egan has covered two Super Bowls and two Olympic games. He is one of the region’s top sports media personalities, and still finds time to remain active with his family, including helping coach several of his three children’s sports teams. Chris is married to Melanie Egan.

References

Living people
Year of birth missing (living people)
Pacific Lutheran University alumni
American television sports anchors
People from Puyallup, Washington